Rednal & West Felton railway station was a minor station on the GWR's Paddington to Birkenhead main line. Today this is part of the Shrewsbury to Chester line. The distinctive red brick station building (now a private house) can still be seen on the west side of the line.

History
Express trains did not call at Rednal & West Felton, only local services.

On 7 June 1865 it was the site of a rail crash which killed 13 and injured 30. The driver of a heavy excursion train from Birkenhead to Shrewsbury failed to see a warning flag for track maintenance approaching the station and derailed. 

According to the Official Handbook of Stations the following classes of traffic were being handled at this station in 1956: G, P, F, L, H & C and there was a three-ton crane.

References

Neighbouring stations

Further reading

External links
 Rednal & West Felton station on navigable 1946 O.S. map

Disused railway stations in Shropshire
Former Great Western Railway stations
Railway stations in Great Britain opened in 1848
Railway stations in Great Britain closed in 1960